Sterling Byrd Lacy (May 3, 1882 – May 7, 1957) was the 23rd Lieutenant Governor of Colorado, serving from 1925 to 1927 under Clarence Morley.

Born in Fredericksburg, Virginia, Lacy served in the Colorado House of Representatives. He was in the insurance business. He died in Daytona Beach, Florida.

His son, William Sterling Byrd Lacy, served as United States Ambassador to Korea in 1955.

References

1882 births
1957 deaths
Politicians from Fredericksburg, Virginia
Members of the Colorado House of Representatives
Lieutenant Governors of Colorado
20th-century American politicians